Provence was a  74-gun ship of the line of the French Navy.

Her keel was laid down in Toulon in 1812 as Kremlin. During her construction, she was renamed Provence during the Bourbon Restoration, Hercule briefly during the Hundred Days, when she was launched, and back to Provence from July 1815.

She was commissioned after 12 years, in 1827, but sustained heavy damage when she collided with the Scipion which was returning from the Battle of Navarino, and had to return to Toulon for repairs.

After the "fan incident", she sailed for Algiers to attempt talks, arriving on 3 August 1829. In July 1830, she was the flagship of Vice-admiral Duperré for the Invasion of Algiers in 1830. On 17 July 1830, she was renamed Alger to celebrate the capitulation of the city.

In 1831, Alger took part in the Battle of the Tagus, under Captain Jacques Leblanc, and later in the Crimean war, bombarding Sevastopol.

From 1855, she was used as a hospital hulk, and was eventually broken up in 1881.

See also
 List of ships of the line of France

References

Ships of the line of the French Navy
Téméraire-class ships of the line
Ships built in France
1815 ships
Crimean War naval ships of France